Written and illustrated by Takao Saito, Golgo 13 has been serialized in the semimonthly manga magazine Big Comic since its January 1969 issue, published in October 1968. The chapters have been collected into tankōbon volumes by Shogakukan and Leed Publishing, a spinoff of the author's own Saito Production, since June 21, 1973. As of December 2022, 207 volumes of the tankōbon edition have been published, while the bunkoban edition has 166 volumes.

In 2006, Golgo 13 was brought back by Viz as part of their Viz Signature collection. The stories are picked from the forty-year history of the manga, and do not necessarily represent the original's order of publication. A total of thirteen volumes were published, with the thirteenth volume being published on February 19, 2008. Each volume ends with an editorial commentary on Golgo 13 as a cultural phenomenon in Japan.

In 2021, the manga broke the Guinness World Record for "most volumes published for a single manga series". The series was tied with Kochira Katsushika-ku Kameari Kōen-mae Hashutsujo which published its 200th and final volume on September 17, 2016.



Golgo 13 SP Tankōbon

Chapters not yet in Tankōbon format 
563. ラブバード
564. 最終兵器小惑星爆弾
566. カルミアの髪飾りの女
567. i-Construction アイ・コンストラクション
568. G戦場のニンジャ
569. 国交回復の朝
570. 英雄は、風の中で眠る
571. フトゥーロ・デ・ボリビア
572. 麻薬地下鉄
573. 琉球の羊
574. 涙も凍る
575. 魔女の銃弾
576. 夢の国
577. 重慶の土龍(どりゅう)
578. 洋上の偽り
579. オーバーラン
580. ビルに立つ男
581. 深海の盾・無音潜水艦
582. マルタの騎士(カヴァリエーレ)
583. ホワイトハッカー
584. 情報屋の弟子
585. 地獄のホバートレース
586. パンダ外交
587. ゴルゴダの少女
588. ナイルの野望
589. マークスマン選抜射手
590. カタールの剣
591. 運の悪い女
592. 複数弾同時着弾
593. AIメティス
594. カリブ海の覇権
595. 楽園の女
596. 死者の手
597. 幻滅のアトランティス
598. モルドバの咆哮(さけび)
599. 臆病者は誰か?
600. 銀翼の花嫁
601. 癒されぬ傷
602. 地図無き悪霊の森
603. パンドラの甕(かめ)
604. RBGの悪夢
605. 地球の裏側で
606. EASY JOB
607. アルマジロの春
608. ジグソー・コード
609. 依頼なき狙撃
610. 覚悟がすべて
611. 逆心のプラントアカデミー
612. 偶然の先に
613. オープンダイアローグ
614. 最終ウイルス
615. 雉も鳴かずば
616. レディ・フィンガー 
617. データセンター奪取 
618. 鳥を見た
619. 超絶技巧ツィガーヌ
620. ラスト・ラフ
621. ベテランズ・デイ
622. 闇から闇へ
623. 藪の中のG

Chapters left out from the books 
These chapters have been left out completely from the SP tankōbon edition.
237. 
245. , included in vol. 171 of the sōshūhen edition
266. 
Special 20. 
Special 32.

Viz Media English volumes

Reference list

Golgo 13
Golgo 13